Raphael Ndukwe Chukwu (born 22 July 1975) is a Nigerian international footballer who played as a striker.

Career
Chukwu has played professionally in Nigeria, South-Africa, Italy, and Turkey for Enyimba International, Udoji United, Shooting Stars, Mamelodi Sundowns, Bari and Çaykur Rizespor.

He participated at the 2000 Africa Cup of Nations, scoring in the Final against Cameroon, and earned ten senior caps for Nigeria.

In September 2004 he was banned by FIFA for failing his contractual obligations towards Çaykur Rizespor.

References

1975 births
Living people
People from Aba, Abia
Association football forwards
Nigerian footballers
Nigeria international footballers
Nigerian expatriate footballers
Serie B players
Süper Lig players
Mamelodi Sundowns F.C. players
S.S.C. Bari players
Çaykur Rizespor footballers
Shooting Stars S.C. players
Expatriate footballers in Italy
Expatriate footballers in Turkey
Expatriate soccer players in South Africa
2000 African Cup of Nations players